Qianmen Subdistrict is a subdistrict in the western portion of Dongcheng District, Beijing, China. In 2020, there are 9,081 permanent residents in this subdistrict.

The subdistrict was named after the Zhengyangmen, a gate which used to be part of the Beijing city wall, and is colloquially known as "Qianmen" to the locals.

History

Administration Division 
In the year 2021, Qianmen Subdistrict contains 3 communities. They are listed as follows:

Landmarks 

 Zhengyangmen

References

Dongcheng District, Beijing
Subdistricts of Beijing